

Mexico as a whole

"Adios Mexico" by Texas Tornados
"Ain't no God in Mexico" by Waylon Jennings
"Alejandro" by Lady Gaga
"Angelo" by Brotherhood of Man
"Are you with me" by Lost Frequencies
"Bay of Mexico" by The Kingston Trio
"Beer in Mexico" by Kenny Chesney
"Cuando Volveras a Mexico" by Juan Gabriel
"De Mexico el Autentico" by Cartel de Santa
"The Devil in Mexico" by Murder by Death
"Down in Mexico" by The Coasters
"Down into Mexico" by Delbert McClinton
"Down to Mexico" by Paul Gilbert
"Earthquakes and Sharks" by Brandston
"Fiesta Mexicana" by Rex Gildo
"Messico e nuvole" by Enzo Jannacci
"Germans in Mexico" by Electric Six
"Going to Mexico" by Steve Miller Band
"Gulf of Mexico" by Shawn Mullins
"Hoy me voy para Mexico" by Menudo
"I've got Mexico" by Eddy Raven
"In Old Mexico" by Tom Lehrer
"Just Like Mexico" by Don Cisco
"Long way to Mexico" by Roger Creager
"Mexican Divorce" by The Drifters
"Mexican Minutes" by Brooks & Dunn
"Mexican Girl" by Smokie
"Mexican Moon" by Concrete Blonde
"Mexican Sky" by Cross Canadian Ragweed
"Mexicano" by Barrio Zumba
"Mexico" by Alestorm 
"Mexico" by Böhse Onkelz
"Mexico" by Carrie Underwood
"Mexico" by Chris Holsten 
"Mexico" by Luis Mariano
"Mexico" by James Taylor
"Mexico" by Lee Dorsey
"Mexico" by Incubus
"Mexico" by Cake
"Mexico" by Ricardo Arjona
"Mexico" by Hombres G
"Mexico" by Timbiriche
"Mexico" by Grupo Niche
"Mexico" by Laura Marling
"Mexico" by Dave Moisan
"Mexico" by Leona Naess
"Mexico" by The Staves
"Mexico" by Carbon Leaf
"Mexico" by Firefall
"Mexico" by Raz B
"Mexico" by Gill Landry
"Mexico" by Brandston
"Mexico" by Nazareth
"Mexico" by Kain
"Mexico" by Motel Motel
"Mexico" by Vicci Martinez
"Mexico" by Mana
"Mexico" by The Soft Pack
"Mexico" by Samiam
"Mexico" by Sammy Hagar
"Mexico Querido" by Dyablo
"Mexico, ya regrese" by Los Rehenes
"Mexico" by Satellite Stories
"Mexico" by The Handsome Devil
"Mexico" by The Movement
"Mexico" by River City Extension
"Mexico City" by Jolie Holland
"Mexico" by Clay Walker
"Mexico" by Zangeres Zonder Naam
"Mexico Hermoso" by Grupo Juda
"Mexico de Noche" by Banda Perla de Michoacan
"Mexico en la Piel" by Luis Miguel
"Mexico Lindo y Querido" by Javier Solis
"Mexico Texaco" by Whitehorse
"Mi Mexico de Grandeza" by Ricardo Rios
"Mi Mexico de Ayer" by Chava Flores
"Mi Mexico Lindo Adios" by Leo Dan
”Moon over Mexico” by Luke Combs
"O Mexico" by Trisha Yearwood
 "Pancho and Lefty" by Townes Van Zandt and many others
"Playboys of the Southwestern World" by Blake Shelton
"Postcard from Mexico" by Nashville Cast
"Run to Mexico" by The Babys
"The Seashores of Old Mexico" by George Strait
"So Good" by B.o.B.
"Stays in Mexico" by Toby Keith
 South of the Border, recorded my many artists
"That's Why God Made Mexico" by Tim Mcgraw
"Viva Mexico" by Aida Cuevas
"Yo soy Mexicano" by Mexikan Sound System
"You Me and Mexico" by Edward Bear

Acapulco

"Acapulco" by Luis Mariano
"Acapulco Gold" by The Rainy Daze
"Acapulco Goldie" by Dr. Hook
"Loco in Acapulco" by The Four Tops
"Fun in Acapulco"  by Elvis Presley
"You Can't Say No in Acapulco"  by Elvis Presley
"Come Fly With Me"  by Frank Sinatra

Atlixco

"Atlixco y mi Cantar" by Ricardo Rios

Baja California

"Baja Bus" by Butts Band
"Puro Cachanilla" by Antonio Valdez Herrera
"Afterglow" by The Driver Era

Culiacan

"Culiacan Sinaloa" by Chalino Sanchez
"Un Fin de Semana en Culiacan" by Espinoza Paz

Mexicali

"Mexicali Rose" by Jack Tenney
"Mexicali Moon" by Frank Harford
"Mexicali" (Part of "Música para charlar") by Silvestre Revueltas
"Mexicali nose by Harry Betts
"Mexicali Blues" by Bob Weir
"Puro Cachanilla" by Antonio Valdez Herrera

Mexico City
"Zocalo" by Beirut
"Mexico City" by Jolie Holland
"Back Seat of My Car" by Paul and Linda McCartney

Sinaloa

"El Sinaloense" by Severiano Briseño

Tampico

 "Tampico" by June Christy
 "Tampico Trauma" by Jimmy Buffett
 "Einmal in Tampico" (Peter Moesser / Lotar Olias) by Freddy Quinn
 "Tampico" by Eddie Meduza
 "Tampico Twist" (Franny Beecher) by Bill Haley & His Comets
 "En Tampico Está Lloviendo" by Lydia Mendoza
 "Beguine Tampico" by Tony Mottola
 "La Conocí en Tampico" (Montes) by Pepe Marchena
 "Tampico" (Adolf von Kleebsattel ) by Heino
Chanson de Margaret (Pierre Mac Orlan/V.Marceau) Marie Dubas/ Vals / c.1957 / France"
De Tampico a Panama (André Paté) Rico's Creole Band / Bolero /1952 /France 
Zwischen Panama und Tampico (Gerhard Wendland) Pop/c.1955-62/Germany
 For more information: click here

Tijuana
"The Tijuana Jail" by Kingston Trio
"Born in East L.A." by Cheech Marin
"Welcome to Tijuana" by Manu Chao
"Tijuana makes me happy" by Nortec Collective
"Tijuana Sound Machine" by Nortec Collective
"Tijuna Taxi" by Herb Alpert and the Tijuana Brass

Veracruz

 "Veracruz" by Warren Zevon

Mexican music
Mexican music-related lists